Telangana State Sports School (TSSS) is a sports school belonging to Government of Telangana located at Hakimpet, Hyderabad. It offers students training along with education at the school. It bagged best sports school in India – 2017 at SFA Hyderabad Championship. The school students bagged over 100 medals at international and over 1800 medals at the national level sports events.

Campus
The school started in 1993 on 206 acres at Thumkunta near Hakimpet Air Force Station. The sports offered at the school include kabbaddi, archery, gymnastics, judo, volleyball, football, water sports (rowing, sailing, kayaking and canoeing), sepak takraw, and track and field athletics.

There is an indoor stadium for gymnastics, 400 metre track, archery ground, football ground, volleyball courts, weightlifting hall and a conditioning hall.

Admission
The admission notification is issued in May every year, for an intake of 40 students. The school has a hostel facility with 144 rooms. The students are selected for Class 4 at the age of 8. The tests and selections are held at mandal level, district level and state level in different sports. The students are selected based on their performance and potential. The school has classes until class 12 (intermediate).

Notable alumni
 Satti Geetha – 4 × 400 m relay event (2004 & 2008 Olympics)
 Manoj – Archery
 D. Sai Raj – Bronze medalist at 2017 Asian Rowing Championship in Pattaya, Thailand
 Ragala Venkat Rahul – 85 kg weightlifting, Gold Medalist, Commonwealth Games 2018
 Varun Ragala, 78 kg weightlifting, Gold Medalist, Commonwealth Games 2018
 Erra Deexitha – Gold at Commonwealth Weightlifting Championships 2017, Gold Coast, Australia.

See also
Education in India
List of schools in India
List of institutions of higher education in Telangana

References

External links 

Schools in Telangana
1993 establishments in Andhra Pradesh
Educational institutions established in 1993
Medchal–Malkajgiri district
Sports schools